may refer to:

 Any post-war period or era
 Post-war period following the American Civil War (1861–1865); nearly synonymous to Reconstruction era (1863–1877)
 Post-war period in Peru following its defeat at the War of the Pacific (1879–1883). Usually known by its Spanish name posguerra.   
 Jus post bellum in Just War Theory
 Post Bellum, a Czech non-profit

See also

 
 
 Antebellum (disambiguation)
 Interbellum
 Pre-war (disambiguation)
 Bellum (disambiguation)